This is a list of cricketers who have played first-class, List A or Twenty20 cricket for Assam cricket team. Seasons given are first and last seasons; the player did not necessarily play in all the intervening seasons. Players in bold have played international cricket.

A
Abu Nechim, 2005/06
Amzad Ali, 2007/08
Arun Karthik, 2014/15-2016/17
Jagadeesh Arunkumar, 2005/06-2006/07
Rajjakuddin Ahmed, 2017/18
Roshan Alam, 2011/12
Zahir Alam, 1988/89-1994/95
Parvez Aziz, 2004/05

B
Sekhar Barman, 2017/18
Bichitra Baruah, 2006/07-2007
S. Barua, 1969/70
Hemanga Baruah, 1984/85-1991/92
Kalyan Baruah, 1963/64 - 1966/67
Kaustav Baruah, 1990/91 - 1993/94
Madhurya Barua, 1954/55-1972/73
Tapan Barua, 1956/57-1965/66
Hari Prasad Bezbarua, 1965/66 - 1972/73
Nandan Bezbarua, 1966/67-1979/80
Prakash Bhagat, 2010/11
Anshuman Bhagawati, 1994/95-1998/99
Manoj Bhagawati, 1988/89
Saurav Bhagawati, 2002/03-2006/07
Bimal Bharali, 1969/70-1981/82
Sunil Bhattacharjee, 1958/59-1972/73
Jogeswar Bhumij, 2015/16
Naba Bhuyan, 1948/49
Deep Bora, 1993/94 - 1997/98
Umananda Bora, 1983/84
Paramesh Borah, 1984/85 - 1986/87
Rajesh Borah, 1983/84-2000/01
Nishanta Bordoloi, 1994/95-2007/08
Peter Bullock, 1948/49-1951/52

C
Satya Gopal Chakraborty, 1982/83 - 1996/97
Avinov Choudhury, 2022
Debajit Chetia, 1987/88
Bikash Chetri, 2015/16
Bikram Chetri, 2008

D
Amal Das, 1972/73 - 1991/92
Amlanjyoti Das, 2019/20
Arup Das, 2011/12
Bipul Das, 1985/86
Deepak Das, 1988/89 - 1993/94
Denish Das, 2020/21
Ganesh Chandra Das, 1952/53-1984/85
Gautam Das, 1978/79 - 1982/83
Kamal Das, 1975/76 - 1986/87
Krishna Das, 2005/06
Mukut Das, 1975/76 - 1985/86
Palash Jyoti Das, 2001/02 - 2007/08
Pallavkumar Das, 2011/12
Parag Das, 1993/94 - 2008/09
Pritam Das, 2007/08
Rajdeep Das, 2007/08
Rajkumar Das, 1987/88 - 1989/90
Rishav Das, 2013/14
Sauvik Das, 2002/03 - 2007/08
Sumit Ranjan Das, 1996/97 - 2002/03
Pritam Debnath, 2008/09
Gautam Dutta, 1989/90 - 2004/05
Mrinmoy Dutta, 2016/17
Pabitra Dutta, 1987/88-1997/98
Sumit Dutta, 1981/82 - 1988/89

E
Gerald Eastmure

G
Anup Ghatak, 1963/64-1977/78
Subhadeep Ghosh, 1994/95-2004/05
Abhilash Gogoi, 2019/20
Dhiraj Goswami, 2002/03
Deepak Gohain, 2011/12
Rajkumar Mritunjoy Gohain, 2001/02-2004

H
Abani Hazarika, 1950/51-1971/72
Gautam Hazarika, 1983/84 - 1985/86
Probir Hazarika, 1969/70 - 1983/84
Rahul Hazarika, 2015/16
Anwar Hussain, 1965/66 - 1973/74
Sajjad Hussain, 2000/01-2004/05
Mukhtar Hussain, 2017/18

I
Mark Ingty, 2001/02-2005/06

J
Dheeraj Jadhav, 2008/09-2013/14
Saahil Jain, 2019/20

K
Munna Kakoti, 1975/76-1992/93
Arun Kalita, 1984/85 - 1987/88
Jitumoni Kalita, 2017/18
Mukut Kalita, 2007
Prafulla Kalita, 1982/83 - 1985/86
Rupert Kettle, 1948/49 - 1950/51
Badruddin Khan
Nasir Gul Khan, 1994/95-1996/97
Rajat Khan, 2017/18
Arlen Konwar, 2001/02
Naba Konwar, 1980/81-1989/90
GN Kunjru, 1966/67-1966/67

L
Sunil Lachit, 2022

M
Baburam Magor, 1998/99-2002/03
Bitop Mahanta, 2007/08
B. Maitra, 1966/67
Biswajit Majumdar, 1983/84-1994/95
Ranjeet Mali, 2008/09
Subham Mandal, 2019/20
Syed Mohammed, 2012/13-2016/17

N
Sumit Nag, 1983/84
Samarjit Nath, 2001/02
Samarjit Neogi, 1989/90

P
Riyan Parag, 2016/17
Pradeep Phukhan, 1957/58 - 1963/64
R. Puri, 1949/50
Swarupam Purkayastha, 2008/09

R
Aswani Rajbanshi, 1954/55-1964/65
Avasarala Rao, 1987/88
Chandan Rawat, 2004/05-2011
Amalendu Guha Roy, 1948/49 - 1963/64
Avijit Singha Roy, 2009/10
Sibsankar Roy, 2008/09
Wasiqur Rahman, 2015/16

S
Dhrubajyoti Sabhapandit, 1974/75 - 1982/83
Naren Sabhapandit, 1966/67 - 1980/81
Biplab Saikia, 2018/19
Devjit Saikia, 1990/91
Khanin Saikia, 2002/03-2002/03
Kunal Saikia, 2006/07
Pankaj Saikia, 2008
Mohan Saikia, 1974/75 - 1984/85
Subhrajit Saikia, 1993/94-2001/02
A. Sarma, 1955/56
Sidharth Sarmah, 2019/20
Gokul Sharma, 2004/05
Nagesh Singh, 1977/78-1981/82
Rahul Singh, 2017/18
Rajinder Singh, 1988/89-1998/99
Tarjinder Singh, 2005/06
Amit Sinha, 2007/08
Prasanta Sonowal, 2011/12

T
Mrigen Talukdar, 2002/03-2006/07
Hrishikesh Tamuli, 2018/19
Pankaj Tamuli, 2002/03
Sujay Tarafdar, 2006/07
Badal Thakur, 1952/53 - 1965/66
Abhishek Thakuri, 2017/18

U
Sushil Uzir, 1975/76 - 1987/88
Ujjwal Bikash Kashyap (2004-2007) Rangia

Y
Raj Yadav, 2003/04-2006/07

Z
Javed Zaman, 1993/94-2004/05
Zakaria Zuffri, 1982/83-2007/08

References

Assam cricketers

cricketers